Maubert–Mutualité is a station on Line 10 of the Paris Métro. Located in the 5th arrondissement, it is situated at the heart of the Latin Quarter on the Rive Gauche. In 2013, it was used by 2,631,728 passengers, making it the 207th busiest station out of 302 on the Métro network.

History
The station is covered in white tiles like most other stations of the Métro, and uses a barrel vault that runs lengthwise over the tracks and platform. However, it is unique in that near the center of the platform two parallel tubes of moving orange lights trace the curve of the vaulted ceiling over the tracks from one side to the other.

The station was opened on 15 February 1930 with the extension of Line 10 from Odéon to Place d'Italie (now on Line 7). It is named after Place Maubert (Maubert Square) and the nearby Maison de la Mutualité.

Station layout

Gallery

References

Roland, Gérard (2003). Stations de métro. D’Abbesses à Wagram. Éditions Bonneton.

Paris Métro stations in the 5th arrondissement of Paris
Railway stations in France opened in 1930